Ryumino-Krasnoyarsky is a rural locality (a khutor) in Ilyevskoye Rural Settlement, Kalachyovsky District, Volgograd Oblast, Russia. The population was 132 as of 2010. There are 17 streets.

Geography 
Ryumino-Krasnoyarsky is located in steppe, on Yergeny, 22 km north of Kalach-na-Donu (the district's administrative centre) by road. Golubinskaya is the nearest rural locality.

References 

Rural localities in Kalachyovsky District